Bright Lights & Back Alleys is the fourth studio album by the English rock band Smokie, released on 29 September 1977 in continental Europe and 7 October in the United Kingdom by RAK Records. Recorded primarily at Whitney Recording Studios in Glendale, California, from March to April 1977, it was produced by Mike Chapman and Nicky Chinn, as were the band's all previous albums.

Track listing

Personnel
Credits are adapted from the album's 1977 and 2016 liner notes.
Smokie
Chris Norman – lead vocals and backing vocals, guitars, synthesizers and electric piano
Alan Silson – guitars and backing vocals
Terry Uttley – bass and backing vocals
Pete Spencer – drums, percussions and backing vocals

Additional musicians
Tom Scott – lyricon and tenor saxophone (on "In the Heat of the Night")

Technical personnel
Mike Chapman – production
Nicky Chinn – production
Pete Coleman – engineering
Jimmie Haskell – string arrangements (on tracks 1-3 and 5)
Phil Dennys – string arrangements (on tracks 4 and 8)
Cream – sleeve design
Gered Mankowitz – photography

Remastering
Tim Turan at Turan Audio – 2007 remastering
MM Sound Digital Mastering Studios – 2016 remastering

Charts

Weekly charts

Year-end charts

Certifications

References
Notes
"Baby It's You" was recorded in July 1976 at Decca Studios (Paris, France), and "Think of Me (The Only One)" — in August 1977 at Bovema Studios (Heemstede, Holland).

Citations

External links
Discography 1975-1982

Smokie (band) albums
1977 albums
Rak Records albums
Albums produced by Mike Chapman